Elections to the Haryana Legislative Assembly were held on 12 May 1968 to elect members of the 81 constituencies in Haryana, India. The Indian National Congress won a majority of seats and Bansi Lal was appointed as the Chief Minister of Haryana.

Results

Elected members

See also 
List of constituencies of the Haryana Legislative Assembly
1968 elections in India

References 

State Assembly elections in Haryana
1968
Haryana